Happy Valley (Dena'ina: Shtuhtałent) is a census-designated place (CDP) in Kenai Peninsula Borough, Alaska, United States. At the 2010 census the population was 593, up from 489 in 2000.

Geography
Happy Valley is located on the western side of the Kenai Peninsula at  (59.948424, -151.718711). It is bordered to the north by Ninilchik, to the south by Anchor Point and Nikolaevsk, and to the west by Cook Inlet. Alaska Route 1 (Sterling Highway) runs through the CDP close to the shore of Cook Inlet; it leads north  to Soldotna and south  to Homer.

Demographics

Happy Valley first appeared on the 1990 U.S. Census as a census-designated place (CDP).

As of the census of 2000, there were 489 people, 196 households, and 131 families residing in the CDP.  The population density was 5.5 people per square mile (2.1/km2).  There were 398 housing units at an average density of 4.5/sq mi (1.7/km2).  The racial makeup of the CDP was 88.34% White, 6.13% Native American, 0.41% Asian, 0.41% Pacific Islander, 0.82% from other races, and 3.89% from two or more races.  2.86% of the population were Hispanic or Latino of any race.

There were 196 households, out of which 28.1% had children under the age of 18 living with them, 57.1% were married couples living together, 4.6% had a female householder with no husband present, and 32.7% were non-families. 22.4% of all households were made up of individuals, and 6.1% had someone living alone who was 65 years of age or older.  The average household size was 2.49 and the average family size was 2.94.

In the CDP, the population was spread out, with 22.3% under the age of 18, 8.4% from 18 to 24, 24.7% from 25 to 44, 31.5% from 45 to 64, and 13.1% who were 65 years of age or older.  The median age was 42 years. For every 100 females, there were 118.3 males.  For every 100 females age 18 and over, there were 122.2 males.

The median income for a household in the CDP was $30,139, and the median income for a family was $40,156. Males had a median income of $47,917 versus $20,469 for females. The per capita income for the CDP was $19,377.  About 10.9% of families and 17.5% of the population were below the poverty line, including 28.2% of those under age 18 and 6.8% of those age 65 or over.

References

Census-designated places in Alaska
Census-designated places in Kenai Peninsula Borough, Alaska
Populated coastal places in Alaska on the Pacific Ocean